Shaffer Mountain is a mountain located in the Skedaddle Mountains of southeast Lassen County, California. It is around 7.6 km (4.7 mi) north-northeast of Litchfield, California. The mountain stands at 2,054 m (6,739 ft.) tall.

Atop the mountain, there are multiple cell towers accessible via dirt road.

See also 

 Skedaddle Mountains

References 

Mountains of California
Mountains of Lassen County, California